Lockhartia parthenocomos is a species of orchid native to South America. This species is epiphytic and occurs in montane forests and cloud forests.

References

parthenocomos
Epiphytes